was a village located in Shimoina District, Nagano Prefecture, Japan.

As of 2003, the village had an estimated population of 2,250 and a density of 10.87 persons per km². The total area was 206.90 km².

On October 1, 2005, Minamishinano, along with the village of Kami (also from Shimoina District), was merged into the city of Iida.

Dissolved municipalities of Nagano Prefecture
Iida, Nagano